Colm O'Brien (born 4 April 1947) is an Irish épée, foil and sabre fencer. He competed in five events at the 1968 Summer Olympics.

References

External links
 

1947 births
1985 deaths
Irish male épée fencers
Olympic fencers of Ireland
Fencers at the 1968 Summer Olympics
Irish male foil fencers
Irish male sabre fencers